Ivana Gagula, (born on 21 August 1988) is a Swedish model and the Miss Earth Sweden 2007 winner. Gagula represented Sweden in the 2007 Miss Earth beauty pageant, held in Quezon City, the Philippines, on 11 November, where she ended up as Top 16 Semifinalist. 

Gagula is Croatian born in Banja Luka, Bosnia and Herzegovina.

Sources
Ivana Gagula at Miss Earth
Ivana Gagula Biography

1988 births
Bosnia and Herzegovina emigrants to Sweden
Croats of Bosnia and Herzegovina
Swedish people of Croatian descent
Swedish people of Bosnia and Herzegovina descent
Swedish female models
People from Banja Luka
Miss Earth 2007 contestants
Living people